Auraiya was a village development committee in Rautahat District in the Narayani Zone of south-eastern Nepal. Now after formation of local government, Auraiya is in Ishnath Municipality.  Auraiya is 6 km west of the district headquarters Gaur. The village takes its name from "Amla" which means "Indian gooseberry". At the time of the 2014 Nepal census it had a population of 10,832 (5,630 male and 5,202 female; 93.17% Hindu and 6.83% Muslim), in more than 1648 households. The literacy rate is 77%, which is higher than average in Nepal. Most of the people of the village are employed in the "government services" of Nepal like engineering, forestry, medicine, and education.

Border
Its borders Bihar in south, with the two villages Hirapur and Chainpur.

References

Populated places in Rautahat District
Forestry in Nepal